Aporia is an ML observability platform based in Tel Aviv. The company has a US office located in Jose, California.

Aporia has developed an advanced software for monitoring and controlling undetected defects and failures used by other companies to detect and report anomalies, and warn in the early stages of faults.

History 
Aporia was founded in 2019 by Alon Gubkin and Liran Hason. 

In April 2021, the company raised a $5 million seed round for its monitoring platform for ML models.

In September 2021, Aporia launched the first self-serving monitoring platform for machine learning purposes. The platform is free and available to the public. 

In February 2022, the company closed Series A round with $25 million for its ML observability platform. Aporia was named by Forbes as the Next Billion-Dollar Company in June 2022. In November, the company partnered with ClearML, an MLOPs platform, to improve ML pipeline optimization.

In January 2023, a platform for detecting faults in AI systems was launched. The platform called Direct Data Connectors (DDC) was developed to monitor machine learning models by, as goes from the name, connecting directly to training and interference datasets, without the need to duplicate any data to accomplish the task.

References

Companies based in Tel Aviv
Companies of Israel